Margherita Galeotti (1867 – after 1912) was an Italian pianist and composer. She was born in Mauern, Bavaria, and studied piano and composition with Giuseppe Buonamici in Florence and Giuseppe Martucci in Bologna. After completing her studies, she performed as a concert pianist in Europe.

Works
Galeotti composed works for voice, piano, violin and cello. Selected compositions include:
Piano Trio in D minor (1912)
Violin Sonata

References

1867 births
Year of death uncertain
19th-century classical composers
20th-century classical composers
Women classical composers
Italian classical composers
People from Freising
20th-century deaths
20th-century Italian composers
19th-century Italian composers
20th-century women composers
19th-century women composers